Hirtshals Municipality was a municipality in Denmark. It was located on the west and north coast of the Jutland peninsula and belonged to North Jutland County. It was abolished effective 1 January 2007. The municipal seat was located in the town of Hirtshals. Its last mayor was Knud Størup (independent).

Geography 
Besides Hirtshals, it covered the villages Tornby, Vidstrup, Asdal, Tuen, Bindslev, Tversted, Emmersbæk, Lilleheden and Horne.

Merger 
Hirtshals municipality ceased to exist due to Kommunalreformen ("The Municipality Reform" of 2007). It was merged with existing Hjørring, Løkken-Vrå, and Sindal municipalities to form an enlarged Hjørring municipality.

External links 
 

Former municipalities of Denmark
Hirtshals